Plymouth High School is a public high school located in Plymouth, North Carolina, United States.  It is one of two high schools, along with Creswell High School, that are a part of Washington County Schools. It became Washington County High School. The student body is predominantly African American. Panthers are the school mascot.

Football
The Plymouth Vikings football team had an active streak of making the NCHSAA State 1-A football championship game in five consecutive years (2012–2016), and made six appearances overall. The team won championships in 2007, 2012, and 2015.

Accident
On July 30, 1997, ten members of the Plymouth High School marching band were killed when their vehicle was struck by a tractor trailer truck while returning to band camp from their lunch break.

Notable alumni
William Barber II  Protestant minister and political activist
Charles Bowser  former NFL linebacker
Don Brown  author and attorney

References

External links
http://www.washingtonco.k12.nc.us/phs/

Public high schools in North Carolina
Schools in Washington County, North Carolina